This article lists events from the year 2022 in Niger.

Incumbents 

 President of Niger: Mohamed Bazoum
 Prime Minister of Niger: Ouhoumoudou Mahamadou
 Cabinet of Niger: Ouhoumoudou Mahamadou's government

Events

Culture

Sports 

 Niger at the 2021 Islamic Solidarity Games

 Niger at the 2022 World Aquatics Championships
 Niger at the 2022 World Athletics Championships

Deaths

See also 

 COVID-19 pandemic in Africa

References 

 
Niger
Niger
2020s in Niger
Years of the 21st century in Niger